The Northern Alberta Jubilee Auditorium is a  performing arts, culture and community facility, located in Edmonton, Alberta.

General information and history

The auditorium was built in 1957, on a  site adjacent to the University of Alberta to celebrate the 50th anniversary of Alberta. It is owned and operated by the Government of Alberta. The Jubilee is home to the Edmonton Opera, Ukrainian Shumka Dancers and the Alberta Ballet.  For many years it has hosted Broadway shows, stand-up comedians, theatre productions, bands, orchestras, dance festivals and awards ceremonies.

The main theatre hosts 2,538 people on three levels, or 2,416 if the Orchestra pit is in use.  There is also a banquet room, meeting room, rehearsal hall and luxury suite available to rent, along with being able to hold trade shows and meetings in the theatre proper and its lobbies. In 2005 as part of the celebrations for the Alberta Centennial, the auditorium underwent extensive renovations totalling a cost of $91 million.

British rock band Procol Harum performed on November 18, 1971, along with the Edmonton Symphony Orchestra, the show was recorded and later released as a live album, entitled Procol Harum Live: In Concert with the Edmonton Symphony Orchestra.

In January 2010, theatre reviewer Pollstar revealed that the Northern Alberta Jubilee Auditorium was the busiest theatre in Canada, selling 146,555 tickets in 2009, beating its twin, the Southern Alberta Jubilee Auditorium in Calgary (138,515 tickets) and Toronto’s Massey Hall (93,742 tickets).

See also

List of Commonwealth Games venues
Southern Alberta Jubilee Auditorium

References

Further reading

External links
Jubilee Auditorium's website
Edmonton Opera Association

Performing arts centres in Canada
Theatres in Edmonton
Music venues in Edmonton
Opera houses in Canada
Tourist attractions in Edmonton
1978 Commonwealth Games venues
Theatres completed in 1955
Music venues completed in 1955
1955 establishments in Alberta